Mallinella is a genus of spider in the family Zodariidae.

Species
, the World Spider Catalog accepted 218 species:

Mallinella abdita Dankittipakul, Jocqué & Singtripop, 2010 – Borneo
Mallinella abnormis Dankittipakul, Jocqué & Singtripop, 2012 – Malaysia
Mallinella acanthoclada Dankittipakul, Jocqué & Singtripop, 2012 – Thailand
Mallinella acroscopica Dankittipakul, Jocqué & Singtripop, 2012 – Java
Mallinella adonis Dankittipakul, Jocqué & Singtripop, 2012 – Malaysia
Mallinella advena Dankittipakul, Jocqué & Singtripop, 2012 – Thailand
Mallinella albomaculata (Bosmans & Hillyard, 1990) – Borneo, Sulawesi
Mallinella albotibialis (Bosmans & van Hove, 1986) – Cameroon
Mallinella allantoides Dankittipakul, Jocqué & Singtripop, 2012 – Thailand
Mallinella allorostrata Dankittipakul, Jocqué & Singtripop, 2012 – Malaysia, Singapore
Mallinella alonalon Lualhati-Caurez & Barrion, 2020 – Philippines (Luzon)
Mallinella alticola Dankittipakul, Jocqué & Singtripop, 2012 – Thailand
Mallinella amblyrhyncha Dankittipakul, Jocqué & Singtripop, 2012 – Malaysia
Mallinella ampliata Dankittipakul, Jocqué & Singtripop, 2012 – Vietnam
Mallinella angoonae Dankittipakul, Jocqué & Singtripop, 2012 – Malaysia
Mallinella angulosa Dankittipakul, Jocqué & Singtripop, 2012 – Malaysia
Mallinella angustata Dankittipakul, Jocqué & Singtripop, 2012 – Borneo
Mallinella angustissima Dankittipakul, Jocqué & Singtripop, 2012 – Malaysia
Mallinella annulipes (Thorell, 1892) – Malaysia, Singapore, Indonesia
Mallinella apiculata Dankittipakul, Jocqué & Singtripop, 2012 – Malaysia
Mallinella apodysocrina Dankittipakul, Jocqué & Singtripop, 2012 – New Guinea
Mallinella atromarginata Dankittipakul, Jocqué & Singtripop, 2012 – Thailand
Mallinella axillocrina Dankittipakul, Jocqué & Singtripop, 2012 – Solomon Is.
Mallinella bandamaensis (Jézéquel, 1964) – Ivory Coast
Mallinella beauforti (Kulczyński, 1911) – New Guinea
Mallinella belladonna Dankittipakul, Jocqué & Singtripop, 2012 – Sumatra
Mallinella bicanaliculata (B. S. Zhang & F. Zhang, 2019) – Malaysia (Borneo)
Mallinella bicolor (Jézéquel, 1964) – Ivory Coast
Mallinella bidenticulata Dankittipakul, Jocqué & Singtripop, 2012 – Thailand
Mallinella bifida Dankittipakul, Jocqué & Singtripop, 2010 – Borneo
Mallinella bifurcata Wang et al., 2009 – China
Mallinella bigemina Dankittipakul, Jocqué & Singtripop, 2012 – Borneo
Mallinella birostrata Dankittipakul, Jocqué & Singtripop, 2012 – Borneo
Mallinella biumbonalia Wang et al., 2009 – China
Mallinella bosmansi Nzigidahera, Desnyder & Jocqué, 2011 – Cameroon
Mallinella brachiata Dankittipakul, Jocqué & Singtripop, 2012 – Thailand
Mallinella brachyrhyncha Dankittipakul, Jocqué & Singtripop, 2012 – Malaysia
Mallinella brachytheca Dankittipakul, Jocqué & Singtripop, 2012 – Borneo
Mallinella brunneofusca Dankittipakul, Jocqué & Singtripop, 2012 – Thailand
Mallinella calautica (B. S. Zhang & F. Zhang, 2019) – Malaysia (Borneo)
Mallinella calicoanensis Dankittipakul, Jocqué & Singtripop, 2012 – Philippines
Mallinella calilungae (Barrion & Litsinger, 1992) – Philippines
Mallinella callicera Dankittipakul, Jocqué & Singtripop, 2012 – Thailand
Mallinella cameroonensis (van Hove & Bosmans, 1984) – Cameroon
Mallinella caperata Dankittipakul, Jocqué & Singtripop, 2012 – Sumatra
Mallinella capitulata Dankittipakul, Jocqué & Singtripop, 2012 – Thailand
Mallinella chengjiaani (Barrion, Barrion-Dupo & Heong, 2013) – China (Hainan)
Mallinella cirrifera Dankittipakul, Jocqué & Singtripop, 2012 – Sumatra
Mallinella clavigera Dankittipakul, Jocqué & Singtripop, 2012 – Sumatra
Mallinella comitata Dankittipakul, Jocqué & Singtripop, 2012 – Borneo
Mallinella concava Dankittipakul, Jocqué & Singtripop, 2012 – Sumatra
Mallinella consona Logunov, 2010 – Vietnam
Mallinella convolutiva Dankittipakul, Jocqué & Singtripop, 2012 – Vietnam
Mallinella cordiformis Dankittipakul, Jocqué & Singtripop, 2012 – Sumatra
Mallinella cryptocera Dankittipakul, Jocqué & Singtripop, 2012 – Thailand
Mallinella cryptomembrana Dankittipakul, Jocqué & Singtripop, 2012 – New Guinea
Mallinella cuspidata Dankittipakul, Jocqué & Singtripop, 2012 – Sumatra
Mallinella cuspidatissima Dankittipakul, Jocqué & Singtripop, 2012 – Sumatra
Mallinella cymbiforma Wang, Yin & Peng, 2009 – China
Mallinella dambrica Ono, 2004 – Vietnam
Mallinella debeiri (Bosmans & van Hove, 1986) – Cameroon
Mallinella decorata (Thorell, 1895) – Myanmar
Mallinella decurtata (Thorell, 1899) – Cameroon
Mallinella denticulata Dankittipakul, Jocqué & Singtripop, 2012 – Malaysia
Mallinella dibangensis (Biswas & Biswas, 2006) – India
Mallinella digitata Zhang, Zhang & Chen, 2011 – China
Mallinella dinghu Song & Kim, 1997 – China
Mallinella dolichobilobata Dankittipakul, Jocqué & Singtripop, 2012 – Malaysia
Mallinella dolichorhyncha Dankittipakul, Jocqué & Singtripop, 2012 – Malaysia
Mallinella dumogabonensis (Bosmans & Hillyard, 1990) – Sulawesi
Mallinella elegans Dankittipakul, Jocqué & Singtripop, 2012 – Malaysia
Mallinella elongata Dankittipakul, Jocqué & Singtripop, 2012 – Malaysia
Mallinella erratica (Ono, 1983) – Nepal
Mallinella etindei (van Hove & Bosmans, 1984) – Cameroon
Mallinella exornata (Thorell, 1887) – Myanmar
Mallinella fasciata (Kulczyński, 1911) – Malaysia, Java, Bali
Mallinella filicata Dankittipakul, Jocqué & Singtripop, 2012 – Thailand
Mallinella filifera Dankittipakul, Jocqué & Singtripop, 2012 – Sumatra
Mallinella flabellata Dankittipakul, Jocqué & Singtripop, 2012 – Borneo
Mallinella flabelliformis Dankittipakul, Jocqué & Singtripop, 2012 – Malaysia
Mallinella flagelliformis Dankittipakul, Jocqué & Singtripop, 2012 – Borneo
Mallinella fronto (Thorell, 1887) – Myanmar
Mallinella fulvipes (Ono & Tanikawa, 1990) – Ryukyu Is.
Mallinella galyaniae Dankittipakul, Jocqué & Singtripop, 2012 – Thailand
Mallinella glomerata Dankittipakul, Jocqué & Singtripop, 2012 – Thailand
Mallinella gombakensis Ono & Hashim, 2008 – Malaysia
Mallinella gongi Bao & Yin, 2002 – China
Mallinella hainan Song & Kim, 1997 – China
Mallinella hamata (Bosmans & Hillyard, 1990) – Sulawesi
Mallinella hilaris (Thorell, 1890) – Java
Mallinella hingstoni (Brignoli, 1982) – China
Mallinella hoangliena Logunov, 2010 – Vietnam
Mallinella hoosi (Kishida, 1935) – Japan
Mallinella immaculata Zhang & Zhu, 2009 – China, Thailand
Mallinella inflata (Bosmans & van Hove, 1986) – Cameroon
Mallinella innovata Dankittipakul, Jocqué & Singtripop, 2012 – Thailand
Mallinella insolita Dankittipakul, Jocqué & Singtripop, 2012 – Thailand
Mallinella insulana Dankittipakul, Jocqué & Singtripop, 2010 – Bali
Mallinella jaegeri Dankittipakul, Jocqué & Singtripop, 2012 – Malaysia
Mallinella karubei Ono, 2003 – Vietnam
Mallinella kelvini (Bosmans & Hillyard, 1990) – Sulawesi
Mallinella khanhoa Logunov, 2010 – Vietnam
Mallinella kibonotensis (Bosmans & van Hove, 1986) – Kenya, Tanzania
Mallinella klossi (Hogg, 1922) – Vietnam
Mallinella koupensis (Bosmans & van Hove, 1986) – Cameroon
Mallinella kritscheri Dankittipakul, Jocqué & Singtripop, 2012 – Sumatra
Mallinella kunmingensis Wang et al., 2009 – China
Mallinella labialis Song & Kim, 1997 – China
Mallinella langping Zhang & Zhu, 2009 – China
Mallinella laxa (B. S. Zhang & F. Zhang, 2019) – Malaysia (Borneo)
Mallinella leonardi (Simon, 1907) – Príncipe
Mallinella leptoclada Dankittipakul, Jocqué & Singtripop, 2012 – Malaysia
Mallinella linguiformis Dankittipakul, Jocqué & Singtripop, 2012 – Thailand
Mallinella liuyang Yin & Yan, 2001 – China
Mallinella lobata (Bosmans & Hillyard, 1990) – Sulawesi
Mallinella longipoda Dankittipakul, Jocqué & Singtripop, 2012 – Borneo
Mallinella maculata Strand, 1906 (type species) – Ethiopia
Mallinella manengoubensis (Bosmans & van Hove, 1986) – Cameroon
Mallinella maolanensis Wang, Ran & Chen, 1999 – China
Mallinella martensi (Ono, 1983) – Nepal
Mallinella maruyamai Ono & Hashim, 2008 – Malaysia
Mallinella mbaboensis (Bosmans & van Hove, 1986) – Cameroon
Mallinella mbamensis (Bosmans & van Hove, 1986) – Cameroon
Mallinella melanognatha (Hasselt, 1882) – Sumatra
Mallinella meriani (Bosmans & Hillyard, 1990) – Sulawesi
Mallinella merimbunenis Koh & Dankittipakul, 2014 – Borneo
Mallinella microcera Dankittipakul, Jocqué & Singtripop, 2012 – Vietnam
Mallinella microleuca Dankittipakul, Jocqué & Singtripop, 2012 – Malaysia
Mallinella microtheca Dankittipakul, Jocqué & Singtripop, 2012 – Malaysia
Mallinella montana Dankittipakul, Jocqué & Singtripop, 2012 – Thailand
Mallinella monticola (van Hove & Bosmans, 1984) – Cameroon
Mallinella mucocrina Dankittipakul, Jocqué & Singtripop, 2012 – Solomon Is.
Mallinella multicornis Dankittipakul, Jocqué & Singtripop, 2012 – Malaysia
Mallinella murphyorum Dankittipakul, Jocqué & Singtripop, 2012 – Malaysia
Mallinella myrmecophaga Koh & Dankittipakul, 2014 – Borneo
Mallinella nepalensis (Ono, 1983) – Nepal
Mallinella ngoclinha Logunov, 2010 – Vietnam
Mallinella nigra (Bosmans & Hillyard, 1990) – Sulawesi
Mallinella nilgherina (Simon, 1906) – India
Mallinella nomurai Ono, 2003 – Vietnam
Mallinella nyikae (Pocock, 1898) – Malawi
Mallinella obliqua (B. S. Zhang & F. Zhang, 2019) – Malaysia (Borneo)
Mallinella obtusa Zhang, Zhang & Chen, 2011 – China
Mallinella octosignata (Simon, 1903) – Bioko
Mallinella oculobella Dankittipakul, Jocqué & Singtripop, 2012 – Thailand
Mallinella okinawaensis Tanikawa, 2005 – Japan
Mallinella okuensis (Bosmans & van Hove, 1986) – Cameroon
Mallinella onoi Dankittipakul, Jocqué & Singtripop, 2012 – Sumatra
Mallinella oscari Dankittipakul, Jocqué & Singtripop, 2012 – Thailand
Mallinella panchoi (Barrion & Litsinger, 1992) – Philippines
Mallinella pantianensis (Zhong, Chen & Liu, 2022) – China
Mallinella parabifurcata (Zhong, Chen & Liu, 2022) – China
Mallinella pectinata Dankittipakul, Jocqué & Singtripop, 2012 – Malaysia, Borneo, Bintan Is.
Mallinella peculiaris Dankittipakul, Jocqué & Singtripop, 2012 – Thailand
Mallinella phansipana Logunov, 2010 – Vietnam
Mallinella platycera Dankittipakul, Jocqué & Singtripop, 2012 – Thailand
Mallinella platyrhyncha Koh & Dankittipakul, 2014 – Borneo
Mallinella pluma Jin & Zhang, 2013 – China
Mallinella ponikii (Bosmans & Hillyard, 1990) – Sulawesi
Mallinella ponikioides (Bosmans & Hillyard, 1990) – Sulawesi
Mallinella preoboscidea Dankittipakul, Jocqué & Singtripop, 2012 – New Guinea
Mallinella pricei (Barrion & Litsinger, 1995) – Philippines
Mallinella pseudokunmingensis (Yu & Zhang, 2019) – China
Mallinella pulchra (Bosmans & Hillyard, 1990) – Sulawesi
Mallinella punctata Dankittipakul, Jocqué & Singtripop, 2012 – Borneo
Mallinella raniformis Dankittipakul, Jocqué & Singtripop, 2012 – Thailand
Mallinella rectangulata Zhang, Zhang & Chen, 2011 – China
Mallinella redimita (Simon, 1905) – India, Sri Lanka
Mallinella reinholdae Dankittipakul, Jocqué & Singtripop, 2012 – Sumatra
Mallinella renaria (B. S. Zhang & F. Zhang, 2018) – Laos
Mallinella robusta Dankittipakul, Jocqué & Singtripop, 2012 – Malaysia
Mallinella rolini Dankittipakul, Jocqué & Singtripop, 2012 – Malaysia
Mallinella rostrata Dankittipakul, Jocqué & Singtripop, 2012 – Thailand
Mallinella sadamotoi (Ono & Tanikawa, 1990) – Ryukyu Is.
Mallinella scapigera Dankittipakul, Jocqué & Singtripop, 2012 – Thailand
Mallinella scharffi Dankittipakul, Jocqué & Singtripop, 2012 – Borneo
Mallinella sciophana (Simon, 1901) – Malaysia, Sumatra
Mallinella selecta (Pavesi, 1895) – Ethiopia
Mallinella septemmaculata Ono, 2004 – Vietnam
Mallinella shimojanai (Ono & Tanikawa, 1990) – Ryukyu Is.
Mallinella shuqiangi Dankittipakul, Jocqué & Singtripop, 2012 – China
Mallinella silva Dankittipakul, Jocqué & Singtripop, 2012 – Thailand
Mallinella simillima Dankittipakul, Jocqué & Singtripop, 2012 – Malaysia
Mallinella simoni Dankittipakul, Jocqué & Singtripop, 2010 – Java, Belitung
Mallinella slaburuprica (Barrion & Litsinger, 1995) – Philippines
Mallinella sobria (Thorell, 1890) – Sumatra
Mallinella sphaerica Jin & Zhang, 2013 – China
Mallinella spiralis Dankittipakul, Jocqué & Singtripop, 2012 – Thailand
Mallinella stenotheca Dankittipakul, Jocqué & Singtripop, 2012 – Thailand
Mallinella suavis (Thorell, 1895) – Myanmar
Mallinella subinermis Caporiacco, 1947 – Tanzania
Mallinella submonticola (van Hove & Bosmans, 1984) – Cameroon, Príncipe
Mallinella sumatrana Dankittipakul, Jocqué & Singtripop, 2012 – Sumatra
Mallinella sundaica Dankittipakul, Jocqué & Singtripop, 2012 – Malaysia
Mallinella superba Dankittipakul, Jocqué & Singtripop, 2012 – Borneo
Mallinella sylvatica (van Hove & Bosmans, 1984) – Cameroon
Mallinella thailandica Dankittipakul, Jocqué & Singtripop, 2012 – Thailand
Mallinella thinhi Ono, 2003 – Vietnam
Mallinella tianlin Zhang, Zhang & Jia, 2012 – China
Mallinella tricuspidata Dankittipakul, Jocqué & Singtripop, 2012 – Malaysia
Mallinella tridentata (Bosmans & van Hove, 1986) – Cameroon
Mallinella triplex Nzigidahera, Desnyder & Jocqué, 2011 – Burundi
Mallinella tuberculata Dankittipakul, Jocqué & Singtripop, 2012 – Thailand
Mallinella tumidifemoris Ono & Hashim, 2008 – Malaysia
Mallinella uncinata (Ono, 1983) – Nepal
Mallinella v-insignita (Bosmans & Hillyard, 1990) – Sulawesi
Mallinella vandermarlierei (Bosmans & van Hove, 1986) – Cameroon
Mallinella vicaria (Kulczyński, 1911) – Java
Mallinella vietnamensis Ono, 2003 – Vietnam
Mallinella vittata (Thorell, 1890) – Sumatra
Mallinella vittiventris Strand, 1913 – Congo, Rwanda
Mallinella vokrensis (Bosmans & van Hove, 1986) – Cameroon
Mallinella vulparia Dankittipakul, Jocqué & Singtripop, 2012 – New Guinea
Mallinella vulpina Dankittipakul, Jocqué & Singtripop, 2012 – New Guinea
Mallinella wiputrai Dankittipakul, Jocqué & Singtripop, 2010 – Belitung
Mallinella zebra (Thorell, 1881) – Aru Is., New Guinea, Solomon Is., Queensland
Mallinella zhui Zhang, Zhang & Jia, 2012 – China

References

Zodariidae
Araneomorphae genera
Spiders of Africa
Spiders of Asia